Mestra is a genus of nymphalid butterfly. It contains the single species Mestra dorcas, the Jamaican mestra, which is found from southern North America to South America and possibly Mestra cana, the St Lucia mestra, found in the Lesser Antilles (though this may be a misidentification).

The wingspan is 35–50 mm. The upperside is gray white to light brown. There is a median row of white spots and an orange marginal band on the hindwings. The underside is pale orange with white markings. Adults are on wing year round in southern Texas, but it is most numerous from June to November. They have been recorded feeding on the nectar of Lantana flowers.

The larvae feed on Tragia neptifolia (which may be a misspelling of Tragia nepetifolia).

Subspecies
Listed alphabetically:
M. d. amymone (Ménétriés, 1857) (Louisiana to southern Texas and in Nicaragua, Costa Rica) – Amymone
M. d. apicalis (Staudinger, 1886) (Bolivia, Argentina, Brazil: São Paulo, Goiás, Pará)
M. d. dorcas Hübner, [1825] (Jamaica)
M. d. hersilia (Fabricius, 1777) (Guyana, Colombia, St. Lucia, Trinidad)
M. d. hypermestra Hübner, [1825] (Brazil: Pará, Paraguay)
M. d. latimargo (Hall, 1929) (Ecuador)
M. d. semifulva (C. & R. Felder, 1867) (Colombia)

References

Butterflies described in 1775
Biblidinae
Fauna of Brazil
Nymphalidae of South America
Butterflies of Jamaica
Taxa named by Johan Christian Fabricius